Chelsea T. Zhang (born November 4, 1996) is an American actress. She portrayed Rose Wilson on the DC Universe / HBO Max superhero series Titans (2019) and had recurring roles on the Disney Channel comedy-drama Andi Mack (2017–2018) and the Netflix black comedy Daybreak (2019). Her film roles include the comedy-drama Me and Earl and the Dying Girl (2015).

Early life and education
Zhang is from Pittsburgh, Pennsylvania. She was a Junior Olympic figure skating qualifier in her preteens. She attended North Allegheny Senior High School. She was accepted early at the age of 16 to the University of Southern California. She graduated from the Marshall School of Business with a degree in business administration in 2017.

Career
Zhang made her debut in 2012 film The Perks of Being a Wallflower. She played the role of Naomi in the 2015 film Me and Earl and the Dying Girl.

From 2017 to 2018, Zhang played the recurring role of Brittany, Bex Mack (Lilan Bowden)'s boss at The Fringe, in seasons 1 and 2 of the Disney Channel series Andi Mack.

Zhang played the role of Sawyer in the 2018 independent feature film Relish, which was featured in several international film festivals, including the 2019 Burbank International Film Festival, where Zhang received several nominations and awards for best supporting actress and best ensemble.

In March 2019, it was announced that Zhang would star as Rose Wilson in the first live action iteration of the character in second season of the DC Universe series Titans. She also played KJ in the 2019 Netflix adaptation of Daybreak.

In November 2021, it was announced Zhang would play Sophie in the film adaptation of Abigail Hing Wen's Loveboat, Taipei.

Filmography

Film

Television

Awards and nominations

References

External links
 

Living people
1996 births
21st-century American actresses
Actresses from Pittsburgh
Marshall School of Business alumni
American actresses of Chinese descent